Joseph Esrey Johnson (April 30, 1906 – 1990) was an American government official who served with both the United States Department of State and the United Nations.

Born in Virginia, Johnson received his educatation at Harvard University.  He was instructor in history at Bowdoin College and Williams College, becoming Associate Professor at the latter in 1938. In 1942 he joined the wartime State Department.  Johnson became chief of the department's Division of International Security Affairs in 1945, having served as acting chief from 1944.

From 1950 to 1971 he was president of the Carnegie Endowment for International Peace. As such he was a strong believer in making efforts towards international cooperation. He was a member of the board of trustees of the World Peace Foundation in the early 1950s. During 1952–53 he was one of five members of the State Department Panel of Consultants on Disarmament and played a significant role in the panel's stark report about the dangers of nuclear weapons and relations with the Soviet Union. From 1954, he was inaugural American secretary of the annual Bilderberg conference which discusses matters relating to European-American relations. In 1962–63, he presented a plan to solve the Palestinian refugee crisis. In 1969, he served as an alternate delegate on the US delegation to the United Nations, working under Ambassador Charles W. Yost.

Johnson was Vice President of the International Institute for Strategic Studies from 1965 to 1981.

References

External links

1906 births
1990 deaths
Harvard University alumni
Bowdoin College faculty
Members of the Steering Committee of the Bilderberg Group
Williams College faculty
Carnegie Endowment for International Peace